Autotoll Limited (Autotoll) provides Electronic Toll Collection (ETC) service in Hong Kong.

Introduction 
Autotoll was established on 1 October 1998, through the merger of the two individual electronic toll collection systems by The Autopass Co. Ltd. and Electronic Toll Systems Ltd.

Autotoll is currently the only service provider of electronic toll collection in Hong Kong. Shareholders include Wilson Group Limited and The Cross-Harbour (Holdings) Ltd.

Similar with the electronic toll collection system in other countries, vehicles with Autotoll Tag can go straight and do not have to stop and pay cash at toll booths.

Autotoll is a pre-paid spending mode. An Autotoll account will be set up upon registration by drivers. A deposit of HK$150 for Autotoll Tag is required with the monthly administration fee of HK$35. When driving into tunnels or toll roads, the transponder communicates by RFID instantaneously with the device installed adjacent to the toll booth to pay the toll by deducting it from a pre-paid account. The pre-paid amount ranges from HK$500 to HK$3,000 according to different vehicle types.

Autotoll has launched the “AutoPark” service in 2006. Vehicles with Autotoll Tag can register “AutoPark” service for free and park at the designated carparks with the barrier gate rising automatically for driving in and out.

History 
In June 1992, The Autopass Co. Ltd. introduced the electronic toll collection system (ETC) to Hong Kong and conduct the first testing phase at The Aberdeen Tunnel. In August 1993, ETC system was installed at a few more crowded tunnels, including Cross-Harbour Tunnel, Eastern Harbour Crossing and Lion Rock Tunnel. The system further applied to Western Harbour Crossing in May 1997, Tai Lam Tunnel in June 1998 and Cheung Tsing tunnel in July 1998.

In September 1995, Electronic Toll Systems Ltd. had developed another electronic toll collection system. It was then installed at Tate's Cairn Tunnel for testing and further expended to Shing Mun Tunnels and Tseung Kwan O Tunnel in October 1997. This system is not compatible with the one from The Autopass Co. Ltd. Besides, the Lantau Link and Tai Lam Tunnel originally planned to use this system too. Due to the merger of these two systems in 1998, the system from The Autopass Co. Ltd. was used instead.

Since the two individual systems had brought inconvenience to motorists, the Autopass Co. Ltd. and Electronic Toll Systems Ltd. merged the systems on 1 October 1998 with the support from Hong Kong Government. And the system was renamed as Autotoll. The service continued at the 9 tunnels and 1 toll road and further expanded to Eagle's Nest Tunnel and Sha Tin Heights Tunnel.

Autotoll has launched the “AutoPark” service in 2006. Vehicles with Autotoll Tag can register “AutoPark” service for free and park at the designated carparks with the barrier gate rising automatically for driving in and out.

Roads with service

Autotoll Tag

The Autopass Co. Ltd. system used before October 1998 
Aberdeen Tunnel (Route 1)(usage from June 1992)

Cross-Harbour Tunnel (Route 1) (usage from August 1993)

Eastern Harbour Crossing (Route 2) (usage from August 1993)

Western Harbour Crossing (Route 3) (usage from May 1997)

Lion Rock Tunnel (Route 1) (usage from August 1993)

Tai Lam Tunnel (Route 3) (usage from June 1998)

Lantau Link (Route 8) (usage from July 1998)

Electronic Toll Systems used before October 1998 
Tate's Cairn Tunnel (Route 2) (usage from September 1995)

Tseung Kwan O Tunnel (Route 7) (usage from October 1997)

Shing Mun Tunnels (Route 9) (usage from October 1997)

Tunnels opened after October 1998 
Eagle's Nest Tunnel and Sha Tin Heights Tunnel (Route 8) (usage from March 2008)

External links
Autotoll Limited

Electronic toll collection